Elisha David Standiford (December 28, 1831 – July 26, 1887) was a United States representative from Kentucky. He was born near Louisville, Kentucky. He attended the common schools and St. Mary's College, near Lebanon, Kentucky. He graduated from the Kentucky School of Medicine and commenced practice in Louisville, Kentucky. Later, he abandoned the practice of medicine and engaged in agricultural pursuits and other enterprises.

Standiford was a member of the Kentucky Senate in 1868 and 1871. He was elected as a Democrat to the Forty-third Congress (March 4, 1873 – March 3, 1875) but declined a renomination in 1874 to the Forty-fourth Congress. After leaving Congress, he was president of the Louisville & Nashville Railroad Company from 1875 to 1879. In addition, he engaged in banking and agricultural pursuits. He died in Louisville, Kentucky in 1887 and was buried in Cave Hill Cemetery.

Louisville's largest airport was originally named Standiford Field before being changed to Louisville International Airport in 1995.  On January 16, 2019, the Regional Airport Authority voted to change the name of the airport to Louisville Muhammad Ali International Airport in honor of the boxer and Louisville native Muhammad Ali. The airport today still retains the airport code of SDF.

References

Notes

Bibliography

External links

 

1831 births
1887 deaths
Burials at Cave Hill Cemetery
Democratic Party Kentucky state senators
Louisville and Nashville Railroad
Politicians from Louisville, Kentucky
Democratic Party members of the United States House of Representatives from Kentucky
St. Mary's College (Kentucky) alumni
19th-century American politicians